Kyle Nelson may refer to:

 Kyle Nelson (American football) (born 1986), American football long snapper
 Kyle Nelson (fighter) (born 1991), Canadian mixed martial artist
 Kyle Nelson (baseball) (born 1996), American baseball pitcher
 Kyle Nelson (soccer) (born 1997), American soccer player